The Spikers' Turf 2nd Season was the second season of the men's volleyball league Spikers' Turf, the counterpart of the women's Shakey's V-League. In 2014, the Shakey's V-League introduced a men's division during its 21st conference. The following year, Sports Vision, the organizers of the Shakey's V-League decided to spin-off the men's vision as a separate tournament, giving birth to the Spikers' Turf.

Open conference 

The Spikers’ Turf Collegiate Conference was the 5th conference of the Spikers' Turf, conference commenced on May 28, 2016 at the Filoil Flying V Centre, San Juan. Six (6) volleyball clubs will compete in this year's Open Conference.

Participating teams

Preliminary round 
 All times are in Philippines Standard Time (UTC+08:00)

Final round 

 Final standings

 Individual awards

Collegiate conference 

The Spikers’ Turf Collegiate Conference was the 5th conference of the league that started on July 30, 2016 and ended on September 10, 2016, games were held at the Ynares Sports Arena and PhilSports Arena. There were twelve (12) competing teams in this conference.

Participating teams

Preliminary round 
 Group A

 Group B

Final round 
 All series are best-of-3

 Final standings

 Individual awards

Reinforced conference 

The Spikers’ Turf Reinforced Conference was the 6th conference of the Spikers' Turf that started on October 1, 2016 and ended on November 12, 2016, games were held at the PhilSports Arena in Pasig. There were six competing teams in this conference.

Participating teams

Preliminary round

Final round 
 All series are best-of-3

 Final standings

 Individual awards

All-Star Game 
On November 20, 2016, Sports Vision launched an all-star game for both Spikers' Turf and Shakey's V-League. For the men's league, it will feature 2 teams (Team Hataw and Team Galaw) that will compose of notable players from various club or collegiate teams.

Teams

Match results

Venues 
 Filoil Flying V Centre, San Juan
 Ynares Sports Arena, Pasig
 PhilSports Arena, Pasig

See also 
 2016 SVL season

References 

Spikers' Turf
2016 in Philippine sport
College men's volleyball in the Philippines